The 2015–16 Boston College Eagles women's basketball team will represent Boston College during the 2015–16 college basketball season. The Eagles, are led by fourth year head coach Erik Johnson. The Eagles, members of the Atlantic Coast Conference, will play their home games at the Conte Forum. They finished the season 15–16, 2–14 in ACC play to finish in fourteenth place. They advanced to the second round of the ACC women's tournament where they lost to NC State.

2015–16 media

Boston College IMG Sports Network Affiliates
Select BC games, mostly home games and conference road games, will be broadcast on ZBC Sports. BC Game notes and stories will continue to be posted through their athletic website and on Twitter by following @bc_wbb.

Roster

Schedule

|-
!colspan=9 style="background:#660000; color:#E7D692;"| Non-conference regular season

|-
!colspan=9 style="background:#660000; color:#E7D692;"| ACC regular season

|-
!colspan=9 style="background:#790024; color:#C5B358;"| ACC Women's Tournament

Rankings
2015–16 NCAA Division I women's basketball rankings

See also
 Boston College Eagles women's basketball
 2015–16 Boston College Eagles men's basketball team

References

Boston College Eagles women's basketball seasons
Boston College
Boston College Eagles women's basketball
Boston College Eagles women's basketball
Boston College Eagles women's basketball
Boston College Eagles women's basketball